Radzimów  is a village in the administrative district of Gmina Sulików, within Zgorzelec County, Lower Silesian Voivodeship, in southwestern Poland, close to the Czech border. 

The village has a population of 784.

Notable residents
 Moritz von Bissing (1844–1917), Prussian general

References

Villages in Zgorzelec County